Jamie Christopherson is an American musician who has contributed scores to a number of popular films and video games, including the movie The Crow: Wicked Prayer, and the games Onimusha: Dawn of Dreams and Metal Gear Rising: Revengeance.

Biography
He was born in Los Angeles, California in 1975. He received a Bachelor of Arts degree from Vassar College in 1997. While living in Boston soon after his graduation, Christopherson worked as an assistant to local television/film composers. Deciding that he wished to pursue his career further, he received his Master's degree in Music from the University of Miami in 2000.

Works

Film and television

Video games

References

External links
Jamie Christopherson's Official Website

Video game composers
American film score composers
American male film score composers
University of Miami Frost School of Music alumni
Vassar College alumni
Living people
Year of birth missing (living people)